Thomas Hewitt Jones (born 24 October 1984) is a British composer and music producer, working predominantly in the fields of contemporary classical and commercial music.

Thomas scored the music for the London 2012 Olympics Mascots animated films.

On 11 July 2016, outgoing Prime Minister David Cameron was recorded humming four notes of an unidentified tune, which created an internet furore; on the following day, Thomas Hewitt Jones released the sheet music for a Fantasy on David Cameron: arranged for high/low solo instrument(s) and piano, which he made available for download from the Classic FM website.

On 26 July 2017, his Worcester Service (Magnificat and Nunc Dimittis) was broadcast live on BBC Radio 3 from Worcester Cathedral.

Thomas's commercial track Funny Song  went megaviral on the Tiktok platform in 2022, with over 8 billion streams worldwide as of July 2022. The track is composed & performed (voice & piano) by Thomas, and published by Cavendish Music.

Early life
Thomas Hewitt Jones was born in 1984 in Dulwich, South London, into a musical family; his parents are both musicians and his paternal grandparents were both composers.

Educated at Dulwich College, he went on to be the organ scholar at Gonville and Caius College, Cambridge. He was the winner of the 2003 BBC Young Composer of the Year competition, and in 2009 received a BBC Music Magazine "Premiere Album" award for producing an album of the music of Imogen Holst.

Composer
On 18 May 2020, during the COVID-19 lockdown, The Choir of Royal Holloway, University of London and soprano Laura Wright released a new single 'Can You Hear Me?', composed by Thomas with words by long-time collaborator Matt Harvey to raise awareness of mental health, encouraging those in need to seek support.

His Christmas carol Lullay, my Liking was recorded by British choir ORA Singers in 2017.

Key Works
2006 - The Facebook song (composed together with Peter Foggitt) 
2008 - The Forbidden Kingdom soundtrack (assistant to composer David Buckley) 
2008 - Under Milk Wood (for Ballet Cymru)
2008 - What Child is This?
2009 - How Green was my Valley (for Ballet Cymru)
2009 - Child of the Stable’s Secret Birth
2009 - Romance for viola and piano
2010 - Lady of the Lake (for Ballet Cymru)
2012 - London 2012 / LOCOG Mascot Animated Films (soundtracks)
2013 - Incarnation: A Suite of Songs for Christmas 
2014 - Wildflower Meadows (for Arts for Rutland)
2015 - Panathenaia (for the British Museum)
2016 - Christmas Party (Christmas Violin Concerto)
2017 - Worcester Service (Magnificat & Nunc Dimittis)
2017 - Lullay, my Liking for ORA Singers, conducted by Suzi Digby
2018 - Electro Cello 
2019 - Neoclassical 
2021 - Cinematic Advertising 
2022 - In Our Service

Music producer
He produced This is the Day (2012) for the English composer John Rutter and his choir the Cambridge Singers and Aurora Orchestra.

Personal life
Thomas scores production music from his own studio facility and lives in London with Annalisa, his wife, whom he married in 2020.

References

21st-century classical composers
English classical composers
People from Dulwich
People educated at Dulwich College
Alumni of Gonville and Caius College, Cambridge
1984 births
Living people